Poètes maudits d'aujourd'hui: 1946–1970 (in English: The accursed poets of today: 1946–1970) is an anthology edited by the poet Pierre Seghers, and published by his own company, Seghers. Each of the twelve poets in the book is introduced by a short study and represented by a selection of their writings. The book also has a general Introduction by its editor.

The poets 
 Antonin Artaud
 Gilberte H. Dallas
 Jean-Pierre Duprey
 André Frédérique
 Roger Milliot
 Gérald Neveu
 Jacques Prevel
 André de Richaud
 Roger-Arnould Rivière
 Armand Robin
 Jean-Philippe Salabreuil
 Ilarie Voronca

See also 
 Poète maudit

External links 
 Publisher's website

1972 books
French poetry collections
Poetry anthologies
 P